La Consolacion College – Novaliches, also known by its former name La Consolacion College - Deparo or colloquially LaCo [pronounced as /lakô/]) is a private Catholic basic and higher educational institution administered by the Augustinian Sisters of Our Lady of Consolation (ASOLC).< in Caloocan, Philippines. It was founded in February 1995 and is one of the two La Consolacion schools in the city of Caloocan, and one of the 24 schools owned and administered by the Augustinian Sisters.

La Consolacion College – Novaliches is the first Catholic educational institution in North Caloocan. The school also holds the distinction of having the largest contiguous campus in the CAMANAVA region.

History
It was founded in February 1995 and incorporated by the Securities and Exchange Commission on March 30, 1995. It used to be known as La Consolacion School - Deparo when the high school and college levels were not yet open for enrollments. Upon the late 1990s, the school started using the name La Consolacion College - Deparo.

Deparo is a barangay in the northern district of Caloocan where the campus is situated. The former Saint Joseph Academy in Caloocan built in the vicinity of the old city hall, which is now known as La Consolacion College Caloocan was established much earlier in Barangay Dagat-dagatan, prior the Second World War. To avoid confusion with the campus in South Caloocan and to attract students from the nearby district of Novaliches, and the Bulacan towns of Meycauayan, Marilao, and San Jose del Monte, the administration opted the use of the name La Consolacion College – Novaliches.

Location and Facilities
Novaliches is officially a part of Quezon City, but Novaliches has been a colloquial umbrella term for the barangays of Caloocan that are situated close to the Novaliches district of Quezon City.

La Consolacion College – Novaliches has the largest campus among all schools administered by the Augustinian Sisters of Our Lady of Consolation. Its location in the North district of Caloocan is in Villa Maria Subdivision of Deparo, which is a few meters away from the border of Bagumbong.

Within the campus stands a steel lattice transmission tower, several hills, farms, gardens, and forests. It is a 5-hectare urban campus, with several buildings connected by long covered walks and driveways.

The campus makes use of solar panels for their electricity, with most of the solar panels located above the Covered Court.

Tagaste Hill
Tagaste Hill is named after the city of Thagaste as a homage to the school patron saint Augustine of Hippo. Atop the hill is the location of the botanical garden.

Mother Rita Barcelo Outreach Building
This building houses the office and classroom built to support the school's educational outreach program, which caters to the impoverished children living in the campus vicinity.

Santo Niño Building
The Santo Niño Building is a one-storey building which houses the pre-school and primary grade classrooms, an extension of the school store and cafeteria, and a playground. The Santo Niño Building is connected to the Mother Rita Barcelo Building by a covered walk that is estimated to be about 700 feet.

Mother Rita Barcelo Building
The Mother Rita Barcelo Building is a four-storey building which houses the intermediate and high school students, and several laboratories catering to several courses for the grade levels housed. It is connected to the Our Lady of Consolation Building by a patio.

Main Canteen
The Main Canteen is connected to the Mother Rita Barcelo Building as an annex. The canteen can accommodate around 300+ persons at the same time.

Our Lady of Consolation Building
The Our Lady of Consolation Building, also known as the Administrative Building, is a four-storey building which houses the convent of the nuns, several administrative offices, faculty rooms, mini-hotel, laboratories, library, and classrooms. The classrooms of this building mostly cater to the college students. On its topmost floor story is an enclosed multipurpose hall that can accommodate more than a thousand guests.

Mother Consuelo Barcelo Building
The Mother Consuelo Barcelo Building was built in the 2010s with three floors, to cater to the growing number of students, due to the implementation of K12 in the Philippines. It is connected to the Mother Rita Barcelo Building and the Covered Court by concrete walkways.

Covered Court
The Covered Court caters to most of the extra-curricular activities and physical education classes of the Basic Education Department.

Student life
The students are grouped into sections named after Catholic saints who are mostly members of the Augustinian order, archangels, and titles of the Blessed Virgin Mary. Every beginning and end of each class, students are to pray Catholic prayers where at the end of the prayer is a call for the intercession of the section saint.

Students are engaged in several extra-curricular activities. The student body is represented and led by the Central Student Government, which holds elections a few weeks before the end of the school year for organizational transitions. The Central Student Government involves students from fourth grade and above. In order to purchase food from the cafeteria and several items in the school store, students are asked to use the tokens bearing the seal of the Augustinian Order, which they can purchase from stations around the campus.

The First Friday Masses are usually celebrated by the parish priest of the Mother of the Redeemer Parish of Deparo. During October, the students pray the Rosary every school day.

The flag ceremonies are held every school day with the singing of the National Anthem, the patriotic oath, and daily Catholic Gospel readings. Since 2002, the prayer for the beatification of Consuelo Barcelo is included in the morning rites. As part of Catholic tradition, everyone in the campus, including guests and staff, are required to pause during the praying of the Angelus at noon and the Divine Mercy First Prayer every three in the afternoon.

See also
La Consolacion College - Baao, Camarines Sur
La Consolacion College - Bacolod, Negros Occidental
La Consolacion College – Biñan, Laguna
La Consolacion College - Daet, Camarines Norte
La Consolacion College - Iriga, Camarines Sur
La Consolacion College – Manila, Metro Manila
La Consolacion University Philippines, Malolos, Bulacan

References

Catholic universities and colleges in Metro Manila
Catholic schools in the Philippines
Catholic elementary schools in Metro Manila
Catholic secondary schools in Metro Manila
Education in Caloocan